Dasygnathus trituberculatus is a species of large scarab beetle native to Australia.

References

Scarabaeidae
Beetles described in 1889
Beetles of Australia